Darreh Ban (also Romanized as  Darreh Bān; also known as Darbān and Darvan) is a village in Tashan Rural District, Riz District, Jam County, Bushehr Province, Iran. At the 2006 census, its population was 783, in 167 families.

References 

Populated places in Jam County